Gonyleptoidea is the most diverse superfamily of the Grassatores. It includes around 2,500 species distributed in the tropics. They are characterized by the simplified male genitalia, with the glans free subapical in the truncus.

Gonyleptoidea is the only group of harvestmen to show maternal care of offspring.

Families
 Agoristenidae Šilhavý, 1973
 Cosmetidae Koch, 1839
 Cranaidae Roewer, 1913
Cryptogeobiiidae Kury, 2014
Gerdesiidae Bragagnolo, Hara & Pinto-da-Rocha, 2015
Gonyleptidae Sundevall, 1833
 Manaosbiidae Roewer, 1943
Metasarcidae Kury, 1994
Otilioleptidae Acosta, 2019
Stygnidae Simon, 1879

The following families were transferred to superfamily Assamioidea:

 Assamiidae Sørensen, 1884
 Stygnopsidae Sørensen, 1932

References

Harvestmen
Arachnid superfamilies